James Edward McGreevey (born August 6, 1957) is an American politician and member of the Democratic Party who served as the 52nd governor of New Jersey from 2002 until his resignation in 2004 following the revelation of his extramarital affair with a gubernatorial appointee.

McGreevey served in the New Jersey General Assembly from 1990 to 1992, as the Mayor of Woodbridge Township from 1991 to 2002, and in the New Jersey Senate from 1994 to 1998. He was the Democratic nominee for Governor of New Jersey in 1997, but was narrowly defeated by Republican incumbent Christine Todd Whitman. He ran for governor again in 2001 and was elected by a large margin.

During his gubernatorial tenure, McGreevey—who was then married to Dina Matos —appointed Golan Cipel, his secret lover, as homeland security advisor despite Cipel's lack of relevant experience or qualifications. On August 12, 2004, following threats of a lawsuit that would have exposed his affair, McGreevey publicly acknowledged his homosexuality and his extramarital relationship; he also announced that he would resign the governorship effective November 15, 2004.

McGreevey published a memoir entitled The Confession in 2006. He later pursued ordination in the Episcopal Church and obtained a Master of Divinity (M.Div.) degree from General Theological Seminary in New York City; however, the Episcopal Church declined to ordain him. In July 2013, McGreevey was appointed head of Jersey City's Employment & Training Program (JCETP). He served in that capacity until his 2019 termination.

Early life and education
McGreevey was born in Jersey City, the son of Veronica, a nurse, and Jack McGreevey, a Marine drill instructor who served in World War II and the Korean War. His family was Irish Catholic, and he grew up in nearby Carteret. There he attended St. Joseph Elementary School, and St. Joseph High School in Metuchen. He attended The Catholic University of America before graduating from Columbia University in 1978. He earned a Juris Doctor from the Georgetown University Law Center in 1981 and a master's degree in education from Harvard University in 1982. He also attended a summer diploma program in law at the London School of Economics.

Career
Prior to entering politics, McGreevey was an assistant prosecutor and executive director of the state Parole Board. McGreevey has taught ethics, law and leadership at Kean University in Union, New Jersey.

McGreevey was a member of the New Jersey General Assembly, representing the 19th Legislative District from 1990 to 1992, when he became Mayor of Woodbridge Township, New Jersey. He was re-elected mayor in 1995 and 1999. He was elected to the New Jersey Senate in 1993, simultaneously serving as mayor during the four-year Senate term.

Governorship of New Jersey
McGreevey first ran for governor in 1997, but was defeated in a close race (47% to 46%) by the incumbent Republican Christine Todd Whitman. Libertarian candidate Murray Sabrin received slightly over 5% of the vote. McGreevey ran for the governorship again in 2001 and won with 56% of the vote, making him the first majority-elected governor since James Florio. His Republican opponent in that race was Bret Schundler. Other candidates in the race included William E. Schluter (Independent), Jerry Coleman (Green), Mark Edgerton (Libertarian), Michael Koontz (Conservative), Costantino Rozzo (Socialist) and Kari Sachs (Socialist Workers).

After being elected to the governorship by a large margin on November 6, 2001, McGreevey inherited a US$5 billion budget deficit. During his term, McGreevey raised the tax on cigarettes and increased the state income tax for the wealthy. Raised as a Roman Catholic but maintaining a pro-choice stance on abortion, he stated as governor that he would not receive Communion at public church services.

Among McGreevey's accomplishments were auto insurance reform, implementing a stem cell research plan for New Jersey, heavily lobbying for the state's first domestic partnership law for same-sex couples and signing such a law in early 2004.

McGreevey's term was controversial, with questions about the credentials of several of his appointees to pay to play and extortion scandals involving backers and key New Jersey Democratic fundraisers, including businessman Charles Kushner.

Golan Cipel controversy

McGreevey was criticized for appointing Golan Cipel as homeland security adviser because he lacked experience or qualifications for the position. In addition, Cipel could not gain a security approval from the federal government, as he was Israeli and not a U.S. citizen. McGreevey had met him in Israel during a trip there in 2000. McGreevey engaged in an extramarital affair with Cipel.

McGreevey brought up Cipel's name six weeks into his administration in a February 14, 2002, interview with The Record'''s editorial board at its offices saying:

The interview prompted news investigation into Cipel's background. On February 21, The Record published a profile of Cipel, calling him a "sailor" and a "poet." The article stated, "Democrats close to the administration say McGreevey and Cipel have struck up a close friendship and frequently travel together," prompting McGreevey's own mother to confront him about his sexual orientation. Various media organizations sent reporters to Israel to ask questions about Cipel and his background.

In August 2002, at McGreevey's request, Cipel stepped down from his position as homeland security adviser. 

Other controversies

David D'Amiano, a key McGreevey fund-raiser, was ultimately sentenced to two years in prison for extorting $40,000 from a farmer, Mark Halper, a Middlesex County landowner cooperating with investigators. In the 47-page indictment, there are repeated references to the involvement of "State Official 1," later revealed to be McGreevey. In a conversation with Halper, McGreevey used the word "Machiavelli," the code arranged by D'Amiano intended to assure the farmer that his $40,000 campaign contribution would get him preferential treatment in a dispute over his land.

McGreevey was also involved in facilitating ventures to profit Charles Kushner, a billionaire real estate developer who later went to jail for crimes related to his financial support for the governor and other political figures. Kushner reportedly introduced Cipel to McGreevey as an inducement to seal his loyalty.

Resignation
On the afternoon of August 12, 2004, faced with threats from Cipel's lawyer, Allen Lowy, that Cipel would file a sexual harassment lawsuit against him in Mercer County Court, McGreevey held a press conference. At the press conference, he said: "At a point in every person's life, one has to look deeply into the mirror of one's soul and decide one's unique truth in the world, not as we may want to see it or hope to see it, but as it is. And so my truth is that I am a gay American". He also said that he had "engaged in an adult consensual affair with another man" (whom his aides immediately named as Cipel), and that he would resign effective November 15, 2004. New Jersey political circles had speculated about McGreevey's sexual orientation and questions about his relationship with Cipel had been alluded to in the media. McGreevey's announcement made him the first openly gay state governor in United States history. The Star-Ledger won the 2005 Pulitzer Prize for Breaking News Reporting for its "coverage of the resignation of New Jersey's governor after he announced he was gay and confessed to adultery with a male lover."

McGreevey's decision to delay the effective date of his resignation until after September 3, 2004, avoided a special election in November to replace the governor. Doing so allowed the Democratic Party to retain control of the governorship for the rest (until January 2006) of the 4-year term. It avoided the prospect of a special election in tandem with the presidential election, which could have resulted in a Republican victory and helped George W. Bush capture New Jersey's electoral votes. Bush did not win New Jersey's electoral votes in the 2004 presidential election, but captured 46 percent of the statewide vote, compared to 40 percent in the 2000 race, and did win re-election.

Almost immediately after McGreevey's announcement, New Jersey Republicans and Democrats alike called upon the governor not to wait until November to resign and instead to do so immediately. An editorial in The New York Times read, "Mr. McGreevey's strategy to delay resignation does not serve New Jersey residents well. The state will be led by an embattled governor mired in personal and legal problems for three months."

On September 15, U.S. District Judge Garrett E. Brown Jr. dismissed Afran v. McGreevey, filed by Green Party lawyers Bruce Afran and Carl J. Mayer, dismissing their claim that the postponement of McGreevey's resignation had left a vacancy, thereby violating New Jersey residents' voting rights. Brown stated that McGreevey "clearly intends to hold office until November 15, 2004. The requirement of holding a special election does not arise. The rights of registered voters are not being violated." Afran re-filed the same suit in Mercer County Superior Court and Judge Linda R. Feinberg heard arguments on October 4, 2004.

Fellow Democrat and New Jersey Senate President Richard Codey took office upon McGreevey's resignation and served the remainder of the term until January 17, 2006. At the time of McGreevey's resignation, the New Jersey State Constitution stipulated that the Senate president retains that position while serving as acting governor. Intense public attention and political pressure directed to the issue of gubernatorial succession in the wake of McGreevey's resignation resulted in a 2006 amendment to the state constitution that created the post of Lieutenant Governor of New Jersey.

Post-gubernatorial activities
Memoir

In September 2006, McGreevey published a memoir, written with assistance from David France as ghostwriter. The memoir was titled The Confession. McGreevey appeared on The Oprah Winfrey Show on September 19, 2006, to discuss and promote the book. It was the start of a two-month promotion of his memoir.

In The Confession, McGreevey describes the duality of his life before he came out as gay: "As glorious and meaningful as it would have been to have a loving and sound sexual experience with another man, I knew I'd have to undo my happiness step by step as I began chasing my dream of a public career and the kind of 'acceptable' life that went with it. So, instead, I settled for the detached anonymity of bookstores and rest stopsa compromise, but one that was wholly unfulfilling and morally unsatisfactory."McGreevey discusses his book The Confession at the San Francisco Lesbian Gay Bisexual Transgender Community Center , New York Times' Times Talks Series, ForaTV, October 14, 2006 (video).

Divinity studies and community-building

McGreevey and his partner Mark O'Donnell regularly attended Saint Bartholomew's Episcopal Church in New York, in addition to a local parish in New Jersey. At St. Bartholomew's, McGreevey was received into the Episcopal Church on Sunday, April 29, 2007. He was accepted to General Theological Seminary, from which he received the degree of Master of Divinity, a prerequisite to becoming an Episcopal priest. In 2009, McGreevey told The New York Times that he volunteered for Exodus Ministries, where he performed service to former prisoners seeking rehabilitation at the Church of Living Hope in Harlem, New York. On November 16, 2009, WCBS-TV reported that McGreevey was continuing his training at All Saints Episcopal Church in Hoboken. An April 2011 report indicated that McGreevey's bid for ordination had been rejected. McGreevey then worked at Integrity House at the Hudson County Correctional Facility with women inmates with a history of drug use.

McGreevey's life after politics, his pursuit of the priesthood, and his ministry to prison inmates are covered in a 2013 HBO documentary film, Fall to Grace'', directed by Alexandra Pelosi.

Jersey City Employment & Training Program and NJ ReEntry
In July 2013, McGreevey was appointed executive director of Jersey City's Employment & Training Program (JCETP). The program, which provides re-entry coaching for those released from prison, along with other services, such as job opportunities and training, and substance abuse rehabilitation is based at The Hub in the city's Jackson Hill neighborhood. Jersey City Mayor Steven Fulop felt as though McGreevey was "a valuable asset" to have in this position relating to his ten-plus years working within the government. Also having first-hand experiences with helping the population of those previously incarcerated by serving as a mentor and spiritual counselor to women at the Hudson County Jail added to his qualifications for the executive director position.

Among those at the September 2014 opening of the facility called Martin's Place (located on the major street of Martin Luther King Drive) were Brendan Byrne, Tom Kean, Steve Fulop, Chris Christie, Robert Menendez, Nancy Pelosi and Cornell William Brooks. The prisoner re-entry program, funded by the New Jersey Parole Board with a $4.2 million grant, is located in Sacred Heart Church, also in the neighborhood. The program is a model for a statewide program to be expanded in 2015, initially to four other counties.

In January 2019, the board of the JCETP voted to terminate McGreevey's employment. A forensic audit suggested that funds had been inappropriately re-directed to another program, NJ ReEntry. McGreevey claimed that independent audits confirmed all funds were accounted for and that the move was political.

During the COVID-19 pandemic in New Jersey, McGreevey sought to place early-release prisoners, many of whom were homeless, in make-shift shelters.

Personal life
McGreevey has a daughter from his first marriage (1991–1997) to Canadian Karen Joan Schutz and another daughter from his second marriage to Portuguese-born Dina Matos.

Matos and McGreevey separated after he revealed that he is gay, and in late 2005 McGreevey and Australian-American executive Mark O'Donnell began a relationship. The two lived in Plainfield, New Jersey. On March 14, 2007, the Associated Press reported that McGreevey was seeking custody of his younger daughter and filing for child support. Matos demanded $600,000 plus alimony. On August 8, the divorce was granted. McGreevey received joint custody and was directed to pay child support. Matos was denied alimony. In her memoirs, Matos wrote that she would never have married McGreevey if she had known he was homosexual, nor would she have chosen to have a homosexual man father her child.

In October 2015, McGreevey moved from Plainfield to Jersey City, sparking rumors that he might run for mayor. He denied the rumors.  As of the beginning of 2023, he had not made any further bid for elected office.

See also

 List of the first LGBT holders of political offices in the United States

References

External links

 
 Huge increase in released N.J. sex offenders is draining resources from other inmates, ex-governor says

1957 births
Living people
20th-century American politicians
20th-century Roman Catholics
21st-century American Episcopalians
21st-century American politicians
Alumni of the London School of Economics
American lobbyists
American memoirists
American people of Irish descent
Candidates in the 1997 United States elections
Columbia College (New York) alumni
Converts to Anglicanism from Roman Catholicism
Democratic Party governors of New Jersey
Gay politicians
Georgetown University Law Center alumni
Harvard University alumni
Kean University faculty
LGBT Anglicans
LGBT mayors of places in the United States
Gay memoirists
LGBT state governors of the United States
LGBT state legislators in New Jersey
Mayors of Woodbridge Township, New Jersey
Democratic Party members of the New Jersey General Assembly
Democratic Party New Jersey state senators
People from Carteret, New Jersey
Politicians from Jersey City, New Jersey
Politicians from Middlesex County, New Jersey
St. Joseph High School (Metuchen, New Jersey) alumni